João Rodrigo Silva Santos (8 November 1977 – ), known as just João Rodrigo, was a Brazilian professional footballer who played as a forward.

Career
João Rodrigo played for Brazilian clubs Bangu, Madureira, Duque de Caxias, Remo, Volta Redonda, Tigres, Duque de Caxias, Olaria, Botafogo (DF) and Bonsucesso. He also spent a short time in Honduras with Olimpia. In 2003, he played briefly for Swedish club Öster, where he played six matches and scored one goal in Allsvenskan.

Death
João Rodrigo was murdered by suspected drug traffickers on 29 October 2013, aged 35, in Rio de Janeiro. He did not return home that night. When his wife opened the door on her way to work the next morning, she found his severed head on the step of their front and, according to the police, inside a backpack. His eyes and tongue had been gouged out, according to Brazilian media reports.

See also
 Death of Otávio Jordão da Silva
 List of solved missing person cases
 List of unsolved murders

References

1977 births
2010s missing person cases
2013 deaths
Allsvenskan players
Footballers from Rio de Janeiro (city)
Association football forwards
Bangu Atlético Clube players
Boavista Sport Club players
Bonsucesso Futebol Clube players
Brazilian expatriate footballers
Brazilian footballers
Brazilian murder victims
Campeonato Brasileiro Série C players
C.D. Olimpia players
Clube Atlético Sorocaba players
Clube do Remo players
Duque de Caxias Futebol Clube players
Esporte Clube Tigres do Brasil players
Expatriate footballers in Honduras
Expatriate footballers in Sweden
Male murder victims
Madureira Esporte Clube players
Missing person cases in Brazil
Nacional Atlético Clube (SP) players
Olaria Atlético Clube players
Östers IF players
Unsolved murders in Brazil
Volta Redonda FC players
Brazilian expatriate sportspeople in Honduras
Brazilian expatriate sportspeople in Sweden